Czeczewo may refer to the following places:
Czeczewo, Kuyavian-Pomeranian Voivodeship (north-central Poland)
Czeczewo, Pomeranian Voivodeship (north Poland)
Czeczewo, West Pomeranian Voivodeship (north-west Poland)